The 2000 Cincinnati Reds season was the 131st season for the franchise in Major League Baseball. It consisted of the Cincinnati Reds attempting to win the National League Central, although coming short in 2nd place. They had a record of 85 wins and 77 losses.  The Reds became only the second team in the modern era of baseball not be shut out for an entire season, joining the 1932 New York Yankees.  The 2020 Los Angeles Dodgers later accomplished this feat, but their season was shortened to 60 games due to the COVID-19 pandemic.

The Reds were managed by Jack McKeon. This was also future Hall of Famer Ken Griffey Jr's first season with the Reds, as he was traded to his long-time father's team from Seattle before the start of the season.

Offseason
 October 30, 1999: Stan Belinda and Jeffrey Hammonds were traded by the Reds to the Colorado Rockies for Dante Bichette and cash.
 November 16, 1999: Brooks Kieschnick was signed as a free agent by the Reds.
 December 13, 1999: DeWayne Wise was drafted by the Toronto Blue Jays from the Cincinnati Reds in the 1999 rule 5 draft.
 December 15, 1999: Elmer Dessens was signed as a free agent by the Reds.
 January 14, 2000: Mark Sweeney and a player to be named later were traded by the Reds to the Milwaukee Brewers for Alex Ochoa. The Reds completed the deal by sending Gene Altman (minors) to the Brewers on May 15.
 February 10, 2000: Mike Cameron, Brett Tomko, Antonio Pérez, and Jake Meyer (minors) were traded by the Reds to the Seattle Mariners for Ken Griffey Jr.

Regular season

Season standings

Record vs. opponents

Notable transactions
 July 12, 2000: Denny Neagle and Mike Frank were traded by the Reds to the New York Yankees for Ed Yarnall, Drew Henson, Brian Reith, and Jackson Melián.
 August 31, 2000: Dante Bichette was traded by the Reds to the Boston Red Sox for Chris Reitsma and John Curtice (minors).

Roster

Player stats

Batting

Starters by position
Note: Pos = Position; G = Games played; AB = At bats; H = Hits; Avg. = Batting average; HR = Home runs; RBI = Runs batted in

Other batters
Note: Pos = Position; G = Games played; AB = At bats; H = Hits; Avg. = Batting average; HR = Home runs; RBI = Runs batted in

Pitching

Starting pitchers
Note: G = Games pitched; GS = Games started; IP = Innings pitched; W= Wins; L = Losses; K = Strikeouts; ERA = Earned run average; WHIP = Walks + Hits Per Inning Pitched

Other pitchers
Note: G = Games pitched; IP = Innings pitched; W = Wins; L = Losses; ERA = Earned run average; SO = Strikeouts

Relief pitchers 
Note: G = Games pitched; W = Wins; L = Losses; SV = Saves; ERA = Earned run average; SO = Strikeouts

Farm system

References

Cincinnati Reds Season, 2000
Cincinnati Reds seasons
Cincinnati Reds